Alan Louden Pearsall (21 May 1915 – 8 March 1944) was an Australian sportsman who played first-class cricket for Tasmania and Australian rules football in the Victorian Football League (VFL) with South Melbourne.

Family
The son of Benjamin James Pearsall (1880-1951), and Olive Mabel Pearsall, née Marsden, Alan Louden Pearsall was born at the Edinburgh Hospital, MacQuarie Street, Hobart, Tasmania on 21 May 1915.

He married Dorothy Eva Bumford on 15 March 1941.

Education
He was educated at the Hobart High School.

Cricket
Pearsall made seven first-class appearances for Tasmania during the 1930s, scoring a total of 300 runs at 23.07 and taking 6 wickets.

He made his debut in a match against an Australian XI team and dismissed Bill Brown for 96. Ian Johnson and Keith Miller are other Test players whose wicket he took in his career.

He opened the batting against Victoria at Launceston in 1935/36 and made the only half century of his career, an innings of 56.

Football
Pearsall played football for Lefroy in Tasmania from 1933 until 1940.

When Pearsall moved to Victoria to do his pilot training he joined South Melbourne and played two VFL games for the club in 1941.

Military service
In World War II, Pearsall served as a Flying Officer with the RAAF.

Death
He died, on active service, on 8 March 1944, when his plane came down into the English Channel.
"Alan Pearsall enlisted in the RAAF when war broke out and trained as a pilot. He was transferred to the RAF and took part in the Battle of Britain as a fighter pilot. On the 8th March 1944 he was returning from a photographic sortie north-east of Calais, France when he radioed to say that his engine on his Hurricane had failed.On instruction he bailed out over the English Channel at around 2000 feet. Aircraft were immediately despatched to search, but no accurate fix was obtained on Pearsall’s position. Air Sea Rescue was delayed due to gale force winds, and although a search continued for two days no trace of Pearsall or his plane was ever found."

See also
 List of Victorian Football League players who died in active service
 List of cricketers who were killed during military service
 List of Tasmanian representative cricketers

Footnotes

References
 World War Two Service Record: Flying Officer Alan Louden Pearsall (408266), National Archives of Australia.
 Roll of Honour: Flying Officer Alan Louden Pearsall (408266), Australian War Memorial.
 RAAF Casualty List: Overseas: Previously Reported Missing, Now Presumed Dead: Pearsall, A.L. FO, Sandy Bay (T), The Argus, (Monday, 12 March 1945), p.7.
 Main, J. & Allen, D., "Pearsall, Alan", pp. 311–314 in Main, J. & Allen, D., Fallen – The Ultimate Heroes: Footballers Who Never Returned From War, Crown Content, (Melbourne), 2002.

External links
 Allan (sic) Pearsall's playing statistics from AFL Tables
 Allan (sic) Pearsall's profile at AustralianFootball.com
 Cricinfo profile

1915 births
1944 deaths
Australian rules footballers from Tasmania
Sydney Swans players
Lefroy Football Club players
Australian cricketers
Tasmania cricketers
Royal Australian Air Force officers
Royal Australian Air Force personnel of World War II
Australian military personnel killed in World War II
Cricketers from Hobart
Australian World War II pilots